Seconds is a graphic novel by Bryan Lee O'Malley. Published on July 15, 2014, by Ballantine Books, the novel tells the story of Katie Clay, head chef at a prospering restaurant named Seconds, who obtains the ability to fix her past mistakes by writing them down in a notebook, eating a mushroom, and falling asleep. Abusing the power to make her life perfect, Katie ends up creating more problems for herself.

Plot summary

Katie is the founding owner of a popular restaurant named Seconds. Katie inhabits a room in Seconds and is woken up one night by a mysterious, white-haired girl named Lis, who gives Katie a notepad, a single mushroom, and instructions for her to follow to cast a "do-over" spell in order to fix her past mistakes. Katie finds more mushrooms under the floorboard in the restaurant and uses them to fix problems arising with the construction of a brand new restaurant, her relationship with her ex-boyfriend, and to prevent the injury of a waitress named Hazel. Despite Lis' rule of one mushroom per person, Katie ignores Lis' concerns and seeks to use the mushrooms to make her life perfect, but unintentionally creates more problems as a result and disrupts the balance of time and space.

Characters
Katie is the main character and founder of the restaurant, Seconds.  She wants to open up a new restaurant with her business partner, Arthur. However, she gets into quite the predicament when she gains the ability to rewrite the past.

Lis is the house spirit that haunts Seconds. She is the owner of the mushrooms that can rewrite the past and also the one who introduced Katie to these mushrooms; even though she only gave Katie one. Lis wears the outfits and eats the food that Hazel leaves at Seconds to keep her happy.

Arthur is Katie's new business partner who wants to open up a new restaurant, called Katie's, with her.

Max is Katie's ex-boyfriend that broke up with her when she didn't tell him about the new restaurant she wanted. They met when Max was working in the kitchen of Seconds. He eventually gets back together with her unknowingly due to Katie and the mushrooms.

Hazel is a shy waitress that becomes close with Katie after she has an accident in which she burns her arms. However, Katie makes the accident not happen with the mushrooms. She lives with her grandmother and shops at thrift stores. It is revealed that Hazel leaves gifts for the house spirit, Lis, in order to keep her happy.

Chef Andrew is the guy who replaced Katie as head chef at seconds. He is also the guy Katie cheated on Max with in the story.

Reception 
Seconds received positive reviews. IGN awarded it an 8.8/10, with reviewer Jesse Schedeen calling it a "a great way to follow-up the mega-popular Scott Pilgrim series." The Telegraph's Ben Travis also gave the graphic novel a warm review. "As a standalone novel," Travis writes, "Seconds may not have the scope of the Scott Pilgrim series, but it’s a perfectly formed piece. While some pop culture-laden works of art quickly lose relevance, the honesty and humanity in Seconds will keep readers returning again and again."

Film adaptation
In April 2022, it was announced that Blake Lively would direct a film adaptation of Seconds for Searchlight Pictures, with Edgar Wright (who directed and co-wrote the feature film adaptation of O'Malley's Scott Pilgrim series) writing the screenplay and producing the film alongside Marc Platt.

References

External links

 Seconds at Random House, parent of Ballantine Book's, official page.

2014 graphic novels
Ballantine Books books
Fantasy graphic novels
Restaurants in fiction
Canadian graphic novels